The Lord Rector of the University of Aberdeen is the students' representative and chairperson in the University Court of the University of Aberdeen. The position is rarely known by its full title and most often referred to simply as "Rector". The rector is elected by students of the university and serves a three-year term. Although the position has existed since 1495, it was only officially made the students' representative in 1860.

The position exists in common throughout the ancient universities of Scotland with Rectorships in existence at the Universities of Glasgow, Edinburgh, Dundee, Aberdeen, and St Andrews. The position is given legal standing by virtue of the Universities (Scotland) Act 1889 and is the third office of precedence in the university (following the chancellor and vice chancellor / principal).  Rectors also appoint a rector's assessor, who may carry out their functions when they are absent from the university.

The 1996 election was historically unusual in that one of the two candidates (who lost by approximately 100 votes) had recently completed studies at the university, highlighting the fact that there is no rule preventing a member of the student body from standing for the post and that the trend for celebrity candidates might distance the office from the issues of student life. This situation recurred in 2018, when then-Rector, Maggie Chapman, won re-election against a challenger who was, at that time, studying law at the university.

Rector's assessor 
Each rector appoints a rector's assessor to the University Court. He or she maintains a permanent seat in the University Court during the period of their duty. The rector's assessor furthermore acts, with the support of the president of the Students' Association, as the rector's representative when the rector cannot be present, additionally they sit on the Joint Planning, Finance & Estates Committee and Student Affairs Committee in an official permanent capacity. Further roles and responsibilities include being a 'focal point' for the student body to interact with the decision making levels of university governance, and coordinating the on-campus and online presence for the Rector.

In the 2007–08 academic year, James Michael Wilson (a then first-year student at the university) was rector's assessor for Robin Harper. Mr Wilson was the youngest rector's assessor ever to be appointed to the position at the University of Aberdeen or any of its predecessor colleges.

2011 election 
Following complaints about the campaign, the first election of mid-2011 was deemed null and void, and it was decided that nominations would re-open in October.  There were 6 candidates running this time, and on 10/11/11 it was announced that Dr Maitland Mackie would be taking over the position, having received the most votes.

2014 election 
Following Maitland Mackie's death in office, an election was held in November. There were two candidates, with Maggie Chapman winning with 67% of the vote. Chapman is a socialist, a feminist, and co-convenor of the Scottish Green Party. She pledged to focus on housing issues, defending free tuition, better services for students, to create a "strong academic community" and ensure the university has a "positive impact on society".

List of rectors

Rector of King's College, Aberdeen
 1637–? : Arthur Johnston
 1639–1644 : William Guild
 1651–? : Andrew Cant
 1677–1682 : John Menzies
 1805–1814 : The 1st Baron Glenbervie
 1827-1837 : The 8th Viscount of Arbuthnott
 1838–1857 : Lord Francis Egerton, M.P.
 1857–? : John Inglis (who became Lord Glencorse in 1858)

Rector of Marischal College, Aberdeen

 1664–? : The Most Rev. Dr Arthur Rose
 1673–? : George Meldrum
 1675–1678 : No record 
 1679– : Patrick Sibbald  
 1687–1688 : No record 
 1688–1691 : Dr William Blair 
 1691–1713 : No record 
 1714–1715 : John Urquhart, Laird of Meldrum  
 1715–1719 : No record 
 1720–1723 : Sir William Forbes 
 1723–1726 : Thomas Forbes 
 1726–1729 : Patrick Duff 
 1729– : William Duff of Braco 
 1730–1731 : No record
 1732– : Sir Alexander Ramsay of Balmain 
 1733–1736 : No record
 1737– : George Skene 
 1746–1760 : No record
 1761–1764 : Sir Arthur Forbes, 4th Baronet, of Craigievar
 1764–1770 : John Gray
 1770– : Alexander Fordyce
 1772–1781 : No record
 1782–1788 : Cosmo Gordon of Cluny 
 1788–1790 : Francis Garden of Gardenstown
 1790–1792 : Sir William Fordyce
 1792 - 1794: Sir William Forbes, Bt, of Pitsligo
 1794–1796 : James Ferguson, M.P.
 1796–1798 : Alexander Allardyce of Dunnotar, M.P.
 1798–1800 : Sir Alexander Ramsay-Irvine of Balmain, 6th Baronet 
 1800–1802 : Sir William Forbes, 5th Baronet of Craigievar 
 1802–1809 : Alexander Baxter of Glassel 
 1809–1814 : Sir William Grant, M.P., Master of the Rolls
 1814–1819 : Charles Forbes of Auchmedden, M.P.
 1820–1822 : The 4th Earl Fife
 1822–1823 : Charles Forbes of Auchmedden, M.P.
 1823–1824 : The 4th Earl Fife
 1824–1826 : Joseph Hume, M.P.
 1826–1828 : Sir James McGrigor
 1828–1829 : Joseph Hume, M.P.
 1829–1830 : No rector
 1830–1831 :  Charles Forbes of Auchmedden, M.P.
 1831-1832 : The 18th Earl of Erroll
 1832–1833 : Sir Michael Bruce of Stenhouse, 8th Baronet 
 1833–1834 : Sir Charles Forbes of Newe and Edinglassie, Bt
 1834–1836 : Alexander Bannerman, M.P.
 1836–1837 : Dr John Abercrombie
 1837–1838 : John, Lord Lyndhurst
 1838–1839 : Henry Brougham, 1st Baron Brougham and Vaux  
 1839–1840 : John Campbell Colquhoun of Killermont  
 1840–1841 : Sir George Sinclair of Ulbster
 1841–1842 : Sir James McGrigor, 1st Baronet, 
 1842–1843 : Sir John Herschel  
 1843-1845 : The 2nd Marquess of Breadalbane
 1845–1848 : Archibald Alison, Sheriff of Lanarkshire
 1848–1849 : Lord Robertson
 1849–1851 :  John Thomson Gordon 
 1851–1853 : The 13th Earl of Eglinton
 1853–1854 : The 7th Earl of Carlisle
 1854–1855 : Colonel William Henry Sykes, M.P.
 1855–1858 : Austen Henry Layard, M.P.
 1858-1859 : The 5th Earl Stanhope

Rector of the University of Aberdeen
 1860–1863 : Edward Francis Maitland (became Lord Barcaple in 1862)
 1863–1866 : The 1st Earl Russell, Prime Minister 1865-1866
 1866–1872 : M.E. Grant Duff, M.P., Under-Secretary of State for India 1868-1874
 1872–1875 : Thomas Henry Huxley
 1875–1878 : W.E. Forster, M.P.
 1878–1881 : The 5th Earl of Rosebery
 1881–1884 : Prof. Alexander Bain
 1884–1887 : Prof. Alexander Bain<ref>Concise Dictionary of National Biography, 1992</ref>
 1887–? : George Goschen, M.P.
 1890–1899 : The 11th Marquess of Huntly
 1899–? : The 1st Baron Strathcona and Mount Royal
 1902–1905 : Charles Ritchie, M.P.,The Times, Monday, 13 Nov 1905; pg. 9; Issue 37863; col A Chancellor of the Exchequer 1902-1903
 1905–1908 : Sir Frederick Treves, 1st Bt.
 1908–1911 : H.H. Asquith, M.P., Prime Minister
 1911–1914 : Andrew Carnegie
 1914–1918 : Winston Churchill, M.P.,Paul Addison, 'Churchill, Sir Winston Leonard Spencer (1874–1965)', Oxford Dictionary of National Biography, Oxford University Press, Sept 2004; online edn, May 2007 http://0-www.oxforddnb.com.catalogue.ulrls.lon.ac.uk:80/view/article/32413, accessed 10 Sept 2007 First Lord of the Admiralty until May 1915. Thereafter, Chancellor of the Duchy of Lancaster until Nov. 1915.
 1918–1921 : The 1st Viscount Cowdray
 1921–1924 : Sir Robert Horne, M.P.,Philip Williamson, 'Horne, Robert Stevenson, Viscount Horne of Slamannan (1871–1940)', Oxford Dictionary of National Biography, Oxford University Press, Sept 2004; online edn, May 2006 http://0-www.oxforddnb.com.catalogue.ulrls.lon.ac.uk:80/view/article/33991, accessed 10 Sept 2007 Chancellor of the Exchequer 1921–1922.
 1924–1927 : The 1st Viscount Cecil of Chelwood, Chancellor of the Duchy of Lancaster
 1927–1930 : The 1st Earl of Birkenhead, Secretary of State for India 1924-1928
 1930–1933 : Prof. Sir Arthur Keith
 1933–1936 : Walter Elliot, M.P.
 1936–1942 : Admiral Sir Edward Evans
 1942–1945 : Sir Stafford Cripps, M.P., Lord Privy Seal in 1942 and Minister of Aircraft Production 1942–1945.
 1945–1948 : Eric Linklater
 1948–1951 : The 2nd Baron Tweedsmuir
 1951–1954 : Jimmy EdwardsVeronica Davis, 'Edwards, James Keith O'Neill [Jimmy] (1920–1988)', rev., Oxford Dictionary of National Biography, Oxford University Press, 2004 http://0-www.oxforddnb.com.catalogue.ulrls.lon.ac.uk:80/view/article/39930, accessed 10 Sept 2007
 1954–1957 : Admiral of the Fleet Sir Rhoderick McGrigorEric J. Grove, 'McGrigor, Sir Rhoderick Robert (1893–1959)', Oxford Dictionary of National Biography, Oxford University Press, 2004 http://0-www.oxforddnb.com.catalogue.ulrls.lon.ac.uk:80/view/article/34731, accessed 10 Sept 2007
 1957–1960 : John MacDonald Bannerman
 1960–1963 : Peter Scott
 1963–1966 : Brigadier Sir John Hunt
 1966–1969 : Frank George Thomson
 1969–1972 : Jo Grimond, M.P.
 1972–1975 : Michael Barratt
 1975–1978 : Iain Cuthbertson
 1978–1981 : Sandy Gall
 1981–1984 : Robert J. Perryment
 1985–1988 : Cllr. Hamish Watt
 1988–1990 : Willis Pickard
 1991–1993 : Colin Bell
 1993–1996 : Ian Hamilton
 1996–1998 : Dr Allan Macartney, M.E.P. (died whilst in office)
 1998–2004 : Clarissa Dickson Wright"Clarissa Dickson Wright" Aberdeen Press and Journal, 15 November 2001; pg. 4
 2005–2008 : Robin Harper, M.S.P.
 2008–2011 : Stephen Robertson
2012–2014 : Maitland Mackie (died in office)
2014–2021 : Maggie Chapman
2022–present'' : Martina Chukwuma-Ezike

See also
 Aberdeen University Students' Association
 Chancellor of the University of Aberdeen
 Principal of the University of Aberdeen
 Ancient university governance in Scotland

References

External links
 Aberdeen University official information about the Rector

Aberdeen

Aberdeen